UCI Track Champions League is a season-long track cycling competition held over four rounds around Europe during November and December. It was established in 2021 from a partnership between the UCI and Discovery Sports Events, and was originally titled the UCI Track Cycling World League.

The competition consists of two categories: endurance and sprint events, where overall titles are awarded for each at the end of the series. The endurance events consist of an elimination race and a scratch race, while the sprint events consist of the keirin and the individual sprint.

Overall winners

Men

Sprint

Endurance

Women

Sprint

Endurance

References 

 
Track cycling races